USS Quentin Walsh (DDG-132) is a planned United States Navy  Flight III guided missile destroyer, the 82nd overall for the class. She will be named for Captain Quentin Walsh (1910–2000), a  United States Coast Guard officer who earned the Navy Cross during the World War II.

References

 

Proposed ships of the United States Navy
Arleigh Burke-class destroyers